Hermitage station is a train station in Nashville, Tennessee, serving the Music City Star regional rail line. It serves Nashville's Hermitage area. Service began September 18, 2006.

References

External links
Station from Andrew Jackson Parkway from Google Maps Street View

Buildings and structures in Davidson County, Tennessee
Music City Star stations
Railway stations in the United States opened in 2006
Transportation in Davidson County, Tennessee
2006 establishments in Tennessee